Limnobacter is a genus of Gram-negative, non-spore-forming, aerobic, oxidase- and catalase-positive, motile bacteria with a single polar flagellum, of the family Burkholderiaceae and class Betaproteobacteria. Limnobacter species have the ability to oxidize thiosulfate.

References

Burkholderiaceae
Bacteria genera